Masayasu is both a given name and a surname. Notable people with the name include:

Hotta Masayasu (1848–1911), Japanese politician
Inaba Masayasu (1640–1684), Japanese feudal lord
Masayasu Wakabayashi (born 1978), Japanese comedian, television presenter, and actor